"Carrying a Torch" is a popular song written by Northern Irish singer-songwriter Van Morrison and released on his 1991 double album, Hymns to the Silence. It was also included on his 2015 album "Duets: Re-working the Catalogue" with Clare Teal.

Rolling Stone magazine reviewer Elysa Gardner praised the song, saying that it "has the makings of a classic, with a stately chorus and shining verses that tie the flesh to the spirit: 'You're the keeper of the flame/And you burn so bright/Baby why don't we re-connect/Move into the light'."

Cover versions
Tom Jones also recorded the song, together with Van Morrison, on his album Carrying a Torch (released the same year, in March). Their version of the song was released as a single and charted at No. 57 in 1991 in the UK. This collaboration came about when Morrison showed his newly written song "Carrying a Torch" to Jones, who was "so impressed that he invited Morrison to play on his new record" (Johnny Rogan). Morrison wrote, played on and produced four tracks that appeared on Jones' album.

Bob Dylan has also performed the song occasionally at his concerts.

Personnel on original release
Van Morrison – vocals
Paul Robinson – drums
Nicky Scott – bass
Neil Drinkwater – piano, synthesizer
Carol Kenyon and Katie Kissoon – backing vocals
Fiachra Trench – string arrangements
Gavyn Wright – string section leader

Notes

References
Rogan, Johnny (2006). Van Morrison: No Surrender, London:Vintage Books 

Van Morrison songs
Songs written by Van Morrison
Tom Jones (singer) songs
1991 singles
1991 songs